The Country Girl is a 1915 American short silent romantic comedy-drama film starring Florence La Badie and directed by Frederic Richard Sullivan. The film is based on David Garrick's 1766 play The Country Girl.

Cast
 Florence La Badie as Phyllis, the Country Girl
 Justus D. Barnes as The Squire, her Guardian
 Harry Benham as Belville, Phyllis' Lover
 Claude Cooper as Sparkish, an Old Beau
 Carey L. Hastings as Alithea, his Sister
 Morgan Jones as Harcourt, a Young Suitor

References

External links

1915 films
1910s romantic comedy-drama films
American romantic comedy-drama films
American silent short films
American black-and-white films
American films based on plays
Thanhouser Company films
1915 comedy films
1915 drama films
1910s American films
1910s English-language films
Silent romantic comedy-drama films
Silent American comedy-drama films